Berk–Tabatznik syndrome is a medical condition with an unknown cause that shows symptoms of short stature, congenital optic atrophy and brachytelephalangy. This condition is extremely rare with only two cases being found.

See also
 Heart-hand diseases
 Rare disease

References

Further reading

External links 

Rare syndromes
Syndromes affecting stature
Syndromes affecting the optic nerve